Running Russell Simmons is an American reality television series on Oxygen that premiered on November 2, 2010. The series chronicles the lives of Russell Simmons and his assistants as they manage his business deals, family life and party planning.

Cast 

Russell Simmons
Simone Reyes
Christina Paljusaj
Adair Curtis
Tricia Clarke-Stone
Piper McCoy
Aly Kinloch
Sagen Albert

Episodes

References

2010s American reality television series
2010 American television series debuts
2010 American television series endings
Television shows set in New York City
Oxygen (TV channel) original programming